Orford Ness is a cuspate foreland shingle spit on the Suffolk coast in Great Britain.

Orford Ness may also refer to:
 Orford Ness, Queensland, a headland, defining the southern end of Orford Bay, in the Apudthama National Park, in Queensland.
 False Orford Ness, a headland to the southeast of Orford Ness, Queensland.